"Devotion" is a single by R&B band Earth, Wind & Fire released in 1974 on Columbia Records. "Devotion" peaked at No. 23 on the Billboard Hot Soul Songs chart and No. 33 on the Billboard Hot 100 chart.

Overview
Devotion was produced by Joe Wissert and Maurice White and composed by White and Philip Bailey. The single's b-side was a song called "Fair But So Uncool". Both songs appeared on the band's 1974 studio album Open Our Eyes.

Critical reception
Alex Henderson of Allmusic called "Devotion" "unforgettable". Simon Werner of Popmatters wrote "the softer, reflective shades of "Devotion", represents a line of spiritual evangelism that would also prosper, and draw on a rich range of influences such as Christian and African mysticism and particularly the symbolism of Egyptology." Craig Werner of Vibe stated "Devotion" is "inspired by Afrocentric consciousness".

Record World said that "speaking of the metaphysical in soft funky terms, the visual act delivers a substantial soul ballad."

Covers and samples
Jazz fusion/contemporary jazz group Pieces of a Dream featuring Tracy Hamlin covered the song on their 2004 release No Assembly Required. 
"Devotion" has been sampled by Yo-Yo featuring Ice Cube on the track "You Can't Play with My Yo-Yo" from her 1991 album Make Way for the Motherlode. Mo Thugs sampled "Devotion" on their 1996 single "Thug Devotion" from their debut album Family Scriptures. Rapper Paradise sampled the song on a tune also called "Devotio"n from the soundtrack to the 1997 feature film Gang Related. Drake sampled "Devotion" on the track "Glow" featuring Kanye West on his 2017 playlist More Life.

Credits
 Johnny Graham - guitar
 Al McKay - guitar, vocals
 Verdine White - bass, vocals
 Larry Dunn - piano
 Fred White - drums
 Ralph Johnson - drums
 Maurice White - drums, vocals
 Philip Bailey - vocals

Chart positions

References

1974 singles
Earth, Wind & Fire songs
Songs written by Philip Bailey
Songs written by Maurice White
1974 songs
Columbia Records singles
Song recordings produced by Maurice White